UFC 30: Battle on the Boardwalk was a mixed martial arts event held by the Ultimate Fighting Championship at the Hard Rock Hotel & Casino Atlantic City in Atlantic City, New Jersey on February 23, 2001. UFC 30 was the first UFC event under the new ownership of Zuffa, LLC, and also the first UFC event since UFC 22 to see a home video release.

History
The card was headlined by two title fights, a Light Heavyweight Championship bout between current champion Tito Ortiz and Evan Tanner, and the inaugural UFC Bantamweight Championship bout between Jens Pulver and Caol Uno. After this event, Bantamweight was renamed "Lightweight" under the new Unified Rules of Mixed Martial Arts, defined by the New Jersey State Athletic Control Board. Bantamweight fighters would not again appear in the UFC until after the UFC-WEC merger in 2011. The event featured the first UFC appearances of Phil Baroni, Sean Sherk and Elvis Sinosic.

UFC 30 marked a major turning point for the UFC, as it was the first UFC event held by new owners Zuffa, LLC. Headed by Station Casinos owners Frank and Lorenzo Ferttita, and managed by Dana White, Zuffa acquired the UFC in January 2001 from former owners Semaphore Entertainment Group, who were on the brink of bankruptcy.

One notable change instituted by Zuffa was allowing the championship bout fighters to choose their own entry music in lieu of the standard fare UFC theme song, but that change was not implemented at UFC 30.

Results

See also 
 Ultimate Fighting Championship
 List of UFC champions
 List of UFC events
 2001 in UFC

References

External links
 Official UFC website

Ultimate Fighting Championship events
2001 in mixed martial arts
Mixed martial arts in New Jersey
Sports competitions in Atlantic City, New Jersey
2001 in sports in New Jersey